Live in New York 1.24.04 is the second recording, and first live recording, by Nicholas Payton's electric jazz band Sonic Trance. It was recorded live at the 2004 International Association for Jazz Education (IAJE) conference in New York City.

The recording originally circulated as a bootleg, but became so popular that Payton authorized a limited release by Kufala Recordings, a label that specializes in authorized live recordings. In 2009, the recording was reissued by Kufala as both a CD and MP3 download. The CD began shipping on February 2.

Track listing
[intro] – 0:22
Seance – 2:27
Fela – 6:12
Cannabis Leaf Rag – 4:44
Concentric Circles – 10:02
Go Round – 3:06
Blu Hays – 5:56
Two Mexicans on the Wall – 7:35
I'm Trying to Swing as Little as Possible – 4:16
Stardust – 6:12
Silence – 6:47

Personnel
Nicholas Payton – trumpet
Tim Warfield – saxophones
Scott Kinsey – keyboards
Vincente Archer – bass
Adonis Rose – drums
Daniel Sadownick – percussion

References and external links
Kufala Recordings
All About Jazz review
Amazon MP3 download

2004 live albums